The Lemay House was a historic house at 305 South Cypress Street in Beebe, Arkansas.  It was an L-shaped single story wood-frame structure, built about 1890, and was one of White County's best-preserved vernacular residences from that time period.  It retained original trim elements and period windows, including jigsawn brackets and turned porch posts.

The house was listed on the National Register of Historic Places in 1992.  It has been listed as destroyed in the Arkansas Preservation Program's database, and was delisted in 2018.

See also
National Register of Historic Places listings in White County, Arkansas

References

Houses on the National Register of Historic Places in Arkansas
Houses completed in 1890
Houses in White County, Arkansas
Demolished buildings and structures in Arkansas
National Register of Historic Places in White County, Arkansas
Buildings and structures in Beebe, Arkansas
Former National Register of Historic Places in Arkansas
1890 establishments in Arkansas